

Acts of the Northern Ireland Assembly

|-
| {{|Goods Vehicles (Licensing of Operators) Act (Northern Ireland) 2010|ania|2|22-01-2010|maintained=y|archived=n|An Act to make provision concerning the licensing of operators of certain goods vehicles.}}
|-
| {{|Department of Justice Act (Northern Ireland) 2010|ania|3|12-02-2010|maintained=y|archived=n|An Act to provide for the establishment of the Department of Justice and for the appointment of the Minister to be in charge of that Department.}}
|-
| {{|Pensions Regulator Tribunal (Transfer of Functions) Act (Northern Ireland) 2010|ania|4|12-02-2010|maintained=y|archived=n|An Act to transfer the functions of the Pensions Regulator Tribunal; and for connected purposes.}}
|-
| {{|Water and Sewerage Services (Amendment) Act (Northern Ireland) 2010|ania|5|12-03-2010|maintained=y|archived=n|An Act to enable the Department for Regional Development to continue to make payments to water and sewerage undertakers for a limited period.}}
|-
| {{|Budget Act (Northern Ireland) 2010|ania|6|12-03-2010|maintained=y|archived=n|An Act to authorise the issue out of the Consolidated Fund of certain sums for the service of the years ending 31st March 2010 and 2011; to appropriate those sums for specified purposes; to authorise the Department of Finance and Personnel to borrow on the credit of the appropriated sums; to authorise the use for the public service of certain resources for the years ending 31st March 2010 and 2011; and to revise the limits on the use of certain accruing resources in the year ending 31st March 2010.}}
|-
| {{|Local Government (Miscellaneous Provisions) Act (Northern Ireland) 2010|ania|7|26-03-2010|maintained=y|archived=n|An Act to make provision about the powers of district councils to enter into contracts and to acquire land otherwise than by agreement; to make provision in connection with the reorganisation of local government, including provision for controls on existing councils, for statutory transition committees and for the payment of severance allowances to councillors; to make provision in relation to the exercise of waste management functions of district councils; and for connected purposes.}}
|-
| {{|Budget (No. 2) Act (Northern Ireland) 2010|ania|8|26-03-2010|maintained=y|archived=n|An Act to authorise the issue out of the Consolidated Fund of certain sums for the service of the year ending 31st March 2011; to appropriate those sums for specified purposes; to authorise the use for the public service of certain resources for the year ending 31st March 2011.}}
|-
| {{|Housing (Amendment) Act (Northern Ireland) 2010|ania|9|13-04-2010|maintained=y|archived=n|An Act to amend the law relating to housing.}}
|-
| {{|Forestry Act (Northern Ireland) 2010|ania|10|28-06-2010|maintained=y|archived=n|An Act to make provision in relation to forestry and connected matters.}}
|-
| {{|Budget (No. 3) Act (Northern Ireland) 2010|ania|11|28-06-2010|maintained=y|archived=n|An Act to authorise the issue out of the Consolidated Fund of certain sums for the service of the year ending 31st March 2011; to appropriate those sums for specified purposes; to authorise the Department of Finance and Personnel to borrow on the credit of the appropriated sums; to authorise the use for the public service of certain resources (including accruing resources) for the year ending 31st March 2011; to authorise the issue out of the Consolidated Fund of excess cash sums for the service of the year ending 31st March 2009; and to repeal certain spent provisions.}}
|-
| {{|Employment Act (Northern Ireland) 2010|ania|12|02-08-2010|maintained=y|archived=n|An Act to make provision about the enforcement of legislation relating to employment agencies and the minimum wage; to make provision about the membership of, and representation before, the Industrial Court; to provide for compensation for financial loss in cases of unlawful underpayment or non-payment; and for connected purposes.}}
|-
| {{|Welfare Reform Act (Northern Ireland) 2010|ania|13|13-08-2010|maintained=y|archived=n|An Act to amend the law relating to social security; to amend the law relating to child support; and for connected purposes.}}
|-
| {{|Roads (Miscellaneous Provisions) Act (Northern Ireland) 2010|ania|14|13-08-2010|maintained=y|archived=n|An Act to provide for permit schemes to control the carrying out of works in roads; for prohibiting or restricting the use of roads in connection with special events; for inquiries in connection with the exercise of certain functions relating to roads; and for connected purposes.}}
|-
| {{|Unsolicited Services (Trade and Business Directories) Act (Northern Ireland) 2010|ania|15|15-12-2010|maintained=y|archived=n|An Act to make provision about charges for entries in trade or business directories.}}
|-
| {{|Debt Relief Act (Northern Ireland) 2010|ania|16|15-12-2010|maintained=y|archived=n|An Act to make provision about the relief of debt of individuals and for connected purposes.}}
}}

References

2010